Zachariah John Chappell (born 21 August 1996) is an English cricketer who plays for Derbyshire County Cricket Club after joining them in 2022 from Nottinghamshire County Cricket Club. He is a right-arm fast-medium bowler who also bats right-handed. He made his Twenty20 debut for Leicestershire County Cricket Club against Northamptonshire in July 2015.

References

External links
 

1996 births
Living people
English cricketers
Leicestershire cricketers
Nottinghamshire cricketers
Gloucestershire cricketers
North v South cricketers